Richard Falley Jr. (January 31, 1740 in St. George, Maine – September 3, 1808 in Westfield, Massachusetts) was a soldier who fought in the Battle of Bunker Hill.

Early life
Falley was born on January 31, 1740, in St. George, Maine. He was the son of Richard and Anna (Lamb) Falley. His father was born on Guernsey, but was reputedly kidnapped as a boy and brought to Nova Scotia.

Career
At age 16, Falley joined the Provincial Army and was among those captured by Native Americans at the surrender of Fort Edward. He was taken to Montreal and adopted into the tribe. Later he was ransomed from the tribe by a woman for 16 gallons of rum and returned to Westfield. He later joined Captain Park’s company as an ensign and commanded a company at the Battle of Bunker Hill where his 14-year-old son, Frederick, served there as a drummer, and reportedly "drummed all through the fight."

During the American Revolution, Falley made guns for the Continental Army at an armory at the foot of Tekoa Mountain in Montgomery, Massachusetts. He was for many years superintendent of the Armory at Springfield, Massachusetts.

Personal life
On December 24, 1761, Falley married Margaret Hitchcock (b. May 25, 1741, Westfield, MA - d. February 11 or 18, 1820, Volney (now Fulton), NY) in Westfield, Massachusetts. Together they had 11 children, 10 of whom survived.
 Lovisa Falley, b. Dec 3, 1763
 Frederick Falley, b. Jan 2, 1765
 Margaret Falley, b. Nov 15, 1766
 Richard Falley, b. Sept 15, 1768
 Russell Falley, b. Oct 5, 1770
 Daniel Falley, b. Dec 3, 1772 (did not survive)
 Daniel Falley, b. Nov 15, 1773
 Ruth Falley, b. Dec 7, 1775
 Lewis Falley, b. Jan 15, 1778
 Samuel Falley, b. Oct 9, 1780
 Alexander Falley, b. Apr 4, 1783

Death and legacy
Falley died on September 3, 1808, in Westfield, Massachusetts. He was buried at the Old Burying Grounds off of Mechanic Street in Westfield.

Through his daughter Margaret, Falley was the grandfather of Richard Falley Cleveland, who was the father of Grover Cleveland (twice President of the United States).

Westfield, Massachusetts' Falley Drive is named for him.

References

External links
Historical Marker for Lieut. Richard Falley

1740 births
1808 deaths
Continental Army soldiers
American adoptees
American people of Guernsey descent
People from Westfield, Massachusetts
People from St. George, Maine
Grover Cleveland family